Choreutis metallica is a species of moth of the family Choreutidae. It is found in Queensland.

The wingspan is about 5 mm. Adults have forewings with a pattern of shades of brown, and a sinuous silvery line winding across them. The hindwings are plain brown.

References

External links
Australian Faunal Directory
Image at choreutidae.lifedesks.org

Choreutis
Moths of Australia
Moths described in 1898